The bleating tree frog (Litoria dentata), also known as Keferstein's tree frog, is a species of tree frog in the subfamily Pelodryadinae.  This frog is native to coastal eastern Australia, from south-eastern Queensland, to around Eden, New South Wales.

Description 
The frog is small (45 millimetres) in length.  The dorsal surface of this frog is a dark or pale, rich brown, with broad irregular, lighter bands on each side of the frog starting from the back of the eye.  A dark stripe runs from the snout, through the eye and onto the tympanum. There is a white bar directly under the eye.  The ventral surface is light cream, although in breeding males can be yellow. The fingers are one-third webbed, and toes are two thirds webbed. The tympanum is visible.  The iris is a strong rusty red colour.  During the breeding season males become a yellowish colour.

Ecology and behaviour 

This frog is associated with coastal lagoons, ponds and swamps, in heathland, sclerophyll forest and cleared farmland.  The bleating tree frog is well known for its loud, high-pitched call, which can be painful to humans nearby. Males call from vegetation or ground around the breeding site. Mass breeding and calling can take place on warm, wet, overcast nights during spring and summer.

As a pet 
It is kept as a pet, in Australia this animal may be kept in captivity with the appropriate permit.

References
  Database entry includes a range map and a brief justification of why this species is of least concern
Article Road: List of All Frog Breeds: Things You Can Do to Ensure Your Frog Has a Long, Happy and Healthy Life: Bleating Tree Frog
Department of Environment, Climate Change and Water, New South Wales: Amphibian Keeper's Licence: Species Lists
Cogger, H.G. 1979. Reptiles & Amphibians of Australia. A. H. & A. W. REED PTY LTD. 
Anstis, M. 2002. Tadpoles of South-eastern Australia. Reed New Holland: Sydney.
Robinson, M. 2002. A Field Guide to Frogs of Australia. Australian Museum/Reed New Holland: Sydney.
Frogs Australia Network-frog call available here.

Litoria
Amphibians of Queensland
Amphibians of New South Wales
Amphibians described in 1868
Frogs of Australia